Anastasia Vladimirovna Baryshnikova (born 19 December 1990 in Chelyabinsk) is a Russian taekwondo practitioner. An Olympic bronze medalist in 2012, Baryshnikova won the gold medal in the women's middleweight class at the 2010 European Taekwondo Championships.  She also competed at the 2016 Summer Olympics.

In December 2016, Baryshnikova married Russian taekwondo fighter Aleksey Denisenko.

References

External links
 
 

1990 births
Living people
Sportspeople from Chelyabinsk
Russian female taekwondo practitioners
Olympic taekwondo practitioners of Russia
Taekwondo practitioners at the 2012 Summer Olympics
Olympic bronze medalists for Russia
Olympic medalists in taekwondo
Medalists at the 2012 Summer Olympics
Taekwondo practitioners at the 2015 European Games
European Games medalists in taekwondo
European Games gold medalists for Russia
Taekwondo practitioners at the 2016 Summer Olympics
World Taekwondo Championships medalists
European Taekwondo Championships medalists
21st-century Russian women